The Tyndall Medal is a prize from the Institute of Acoustics awarded every two years to a citizen of the UK, preferably under the age of 40, for "achievement and services in the field of acoustics".  The prize is named after John Tyndall.

List of recipients
Source: Institute of Acoustics

See also

 List of physics awards

References

Physics awards
British science and technology awards